Migrant Help is a United Kingdom-based national charity that has been supporting migrant since 1963.

The charity operates from 10 offices across the United Kingdom, providing advice, guidance and support to asylum seekers, refugees and victims of modern-day slavery and human trafficking. Asylum support services include face-to-face advice both in initial accommodation centers and on an outreach basis, along with a nationwide telephone service. Most asylum seekers have fled war or persecution and many arrive with limited understanding of life in the UK. Migrant Help provides them with advice, information and support to negotiate the asylum system, access services and overcome the challenges of integration.

Migrant Help works on Syrian Resettlement programs with local authorities in South East England, welcoming new families to the UK and supporting and orienting them to their new communities over an extended period. The charity supports access to local healthcare and education services, English lessons, specialist counselling, managing budgets and becoming work ready.

Migrant Help also supports victims of modern-day slavery and human trafficking in England, Wales, Scotland and Northern Ireland.

The charity works with a number of organisations around the UK including local authorities, strategic partners and volunteer groups on community-based schemes.

The charity's phone line services have been criticised by users and charities in the sector since as early as 2015.

Clear Voice 
Clear Voice, a subsidiary trading arm of Migrant Help, is an interpreting and translation service that operates with a pool of 350+ interpreters and translators country-wide in more than 90 different languages. The interpreters work extensively with refugees and asylum seekers.

Clear Voice was established by Migrant Help in 2008 to provide high quality, cost effective and socially aware language services. Clear Voice specialises in the provision of telephone interpreting, face-to-face interpreting and translation services across the UK.

All profits go back into Migrant Help to support its work with vulnerable migrants. In 2017, Clear Voice provided over 89,000 telephone and over 1400 face-to-face interpretation sessions.

History 
Migrant Help was set up in 1963 by Helen Ellis (MBE), a leading figure in provision of welfare support to migrants travelling through the Dover Port since 1946. The organisation, known at this time as the 'Kent Committee for the Welfare of Migrants' (KCWM), was established in response to the growing number of migrants arriving at the Channel Ports.

In 1970, immigrants were given right of 'Appeal' from decisions relating to their entry. The 'United Kingdom Immigrants Advisory Service' (UKIAS), funded by the Home Office, was established to represent migrants on 'Appeal'. KCWM worked alongside the UKIAS as the organisation supporting the welfare of arriving immigrants at the Channel Ports.

Helen Ellis retired in 1993 after 50 years of service to migrants. In the following year the working name Migrant Helpline was adopted. Also in 1994, the charity received a grant from the Home Office to deliver support services to newly arrived asylum seekers.

In 2002, Migrant Helpline was asked by the Home Office to establish and operate the first Induction Center. Here, briefings were delivered to asylum seekers about the asylum process and their rights and responsibilities. Migrant Helpline's operation expanded to London and a reception service for asylum seekers opened in Croydon. The charity was funded to manage the London accommodation center for newly arrived asylum seekers, known as 'Emergency Initial Accommodation'.

A number of projects were established in the following years including the 'Sunrise' project to help new refugees integrate into life in the UK, a 'Training and Employment' project was launched for refugees in Kent (until 2009) and Migrant Helpline was invited to provide an independent important advice service to foreign national prisoners in Canterbury Prison.

The 'European Migrant Advice' service was established in response to the increased call for support from EU migrants in the UK. This service was later extended in 2010 to meet support needs in Suffolk and Norfolk.

In 2008, the 'United Kingdom Human Trafficking Center' approached the charity to provide support for victims of labour exploitation. The 'Victims of Slavery Support Service' team was established.

Migrant Helpline became known as Migrant Help in 2010. The charity continues to work to improve the lives of vulnerable migrants in partnership with other organisations and community groups.

In the migrant support sector in the UK Migrant Help gained the nickname 'Migrant "No" Help' due to complaints made against the charity's services.

Funding
Migrant Help has received significant Home Office funding since 1994. In 2019, it secured a £100 million contract  to run the Home Office system called “Advice, Issue Reporting and Eligibility (AIRE)” services, and act as the official point of contact for refugees to get advice on their asylum claims. In 2021, the Migrant Help contract rose to £235 million.

Projects 
Migrant Help was shortlisted for Charity Awards in 2016 for innovation in advice and support to asylum seekers. Some of the programs that Migrant Help has been involved in are:
 1998-1999 – Dover Asylum Project – Home Office: Provision of reception and casework support to Kosovar refugees arriving from the Balkans.
 2004-2009 – Gateway Protection Programme – Home Office: Provision of reception and orientation services for refugees being resettled in the UK
 2005-2006 – Sunrise Pilot Project – Home Office: Helping new refugees to integrate and find work - write CVs, interview training and identify suitable jobs.
 2006-2007 – Gateway Protection Programme Resettlement Support Service in Brighton – Home Office: Casework support services to newly settled refugees in Brighton.
 2005-2016 – European Migrant Advice Service - Supporting integration of vulnerable and isolated EU migrants into local communities and services across Kent and Suffolk.
 2006-2009 – Training and Employment Project - Big Lottery Fund: To support refugees in Kent to access training and secure employment.
 2015-2016 – Gurkha Information, Advice and Guidance Service - Support services helping retired Gurkha families successful settle into like in the UK.
 2015-2018 – Syrian Vulnerable Persons Resettlement Kent – To provide support to refugees from Syria resettle in Kent.
 2016-2017 – Syrian Vulnerable Persons Resettlement Essex - To provide support to refugees from Syria resettle in Essex.

Controversies
Corporate Watch reported on several complaints against Migrant Help's phone line service for people seeking asylum in August 2022. According to Corporate Watch between September 2019 and September 2021 there were 517 logged complaints against Migrant Help's services.  Migrant Help has also faced complaints against its phone line service by other charities working to support and promote migrant rights  including: Red Cross and Institute of Race Relations.

Employment 
Migrant Help employs 300 people from 40 different countries of origin. Approximately 47 per cent of staff are non-UK born and many have personal experiences of the refugee journey.

Migrant Help holds the "Investors in People" accreditation, is authorised by the Office of Immigration Services Commissioner, holds an Advice Quality Standard mark and is a National Living Wage employer.

References

External links 

 

Crisis hotlines
Organisations based in the London Borough of Islington
Refugee aid organisations in the United Kingdom